Gymnodactylus geckoides is a species of lizard in the family Phyllodactylidae. It is endemic to Brazil.

References

Gymnodactylus
Reptiles of Brazil
Endemic fauna of Brazil
Reptiles described in 1825
Taxa named by Johann Baptist von Spix